Facundo Bagnis won his sixth career ATP Challenger Tour title, beating Arthur De Greef 6–3, 6–2

Seeds

Draw

Finals

Top half

Bottom half

References
 Main Draw
  Qualifying Draw

2016 ATP Challenger Tour
2016 Men's Singles